Lakeport is an incorporated city and the county seat of Lake County, California. The population was 5,026 at the 2020 census, up from 4,753 at the 2010 census.

History
Former names include Forbestown, Rocky Point, Stony Point, Tuckertown, and Kaci-Badon.

Lakeport was first settled by American Indians several thousand years ago. At the coming of the settlers, the Kabe-napos, a subtribe of the Pomo people, lived here within their main village. The village name was Kaci-Badon, after the water lily plant Kaci, and badon, which was the native name for 'island'.

The first business in Lakeport was established in 1855, trading goods to the local Indians in exchange for their wares and baskets. The business was run by a man named Johnson, but he did not have a store location. The first shop built in the Lakeport area was constructed by Dr. Boynton.

It was William Forbes and James Parrish, however, who created the first shop in the main Lakeport area. Parish was a blacksmith and Forbes was a wagon maker. Forbes was also a pioneer undertaker. It was this investment as well as the land grant Forbes bestowed upon the county, which earned Lakeport its first name: Forbestown.

William Forbes came to the area in 1858. He purchased  on which to build his home and farm. When the county was investigating land to put the local county seat, Forbes offered  of his property on which they could build the county office. The electorate thanked Forbes for his generosity by naming the town after him. Although the town no longer bears his name, other landmarks still retain their name association to the late William Forbes.

On June 14, 1861, Forbestown was officially changed to Lakeport. Some locations still bear the Forbes name, however, such as Forbes Creek and Forbes Street.

In 1850, Captain Nathaniel Lyon led an attack in the Bloody Island Massacre. Lyon later died fighting for the Union in the Civil War.

The first post office, called Big Valley, opened at the site in 1858, and changed its name to Lakeport in 1861.

The first Lakeport courthouse was built of wood in 1861. The building burnt under suspicious circumstances in 1867.

In 1864, the Cache Creek Dam was built.  Four years later, the locals tore down the dam and destroyed the mills it helped operate, after waters diverted by the dam flooded most of Lower Lake and Anderson Ranch.

In 1872, a sighting of the legendary "Monster of Blue Lakes" or "Devil Fish" caused Indians from all around to gather at Temescal to await an expected calamity.

In 1882, Black Bart robbed the stagecoach traveling between Lakeport and Cloverdale. During this time period, over 450 Chinese immigrants were employed to work the area's quicksilver mines.

In 1883, William "Digger" Jones was hanged at Lakeport jail. He was wrongfully hanged two days after the sheriff had received the pardon for William "Digger" Jones.

In 1888, Lakeport was incorporated. For nearly a century, it was the only incorporated city in Lake County.

In 1892, Lakeport got its first telephone.

Geography

The Lakeport area is located on a sediment-filled valley adjacent to  Clear Lake.  Exposed materials within the area are limited to serpentinite and quaternary sediments.  These sediments are poorly consolidated to unconsolidated mixtures of sand, silt, clay, and gravel derived from older rock in the adjacent mountains.  Because of the low strength of the quaternary sediments, they are subject to rapid erosion and shallow slumping.

The majority of faults in the County are located in the Cobb Mountain area and Hopland Grade area running southeasterly to the southern County line. The southeastern portion of the County also appears to have considerable earthquake faults. These faults have been responsible for moderate to major earthquakes in the past. The maximum creditable earthquake magnitudes are 8.25 for the San Andreas fault and 6.75 for the Healdsburg fault.

There is a potentially active rupture zone (defined as a fault that has been active during quaternary time – the last 2,000,000 years) existing immediately east of the City limits running parallel and adjacent to the shoreline of Clear Lake.   Within the past 200 years, no major potentially damaging earthquakes have occurred along any faults within Lake County, including the Big Valley fault adjacent to the eastern City boundaries.  Geologically, recent faulting is indicated, however, by the apparent displacement of quaternary earth materials along the Big Valley fault.

The largest earthquake to affect the City was the 1906 San Francisco earthquake which had a magnitude of 8.3.  Although shaking was severe, overall damage in Lakeport was comparatively minor and generally limited to the fall of decorative masonry and chimneys.

The city relies on wells for the majority of its potable supply.  In periods of high rainfall, flooding from Clear Lake, Scotts Creek and Forbes Creek, has caused historic property damage.

Climate
Lakeport, like all of the Clear Lake area, has hot, mostly dry summers and cool, wet winters. Its climate can be classified as hot-summer Mediterranean climate according to the Köppen climate classification system.

There are an average of 66 days with measurable precipitation.

Snow is relatively rare in Lakeport, but common in the surrounding mountains.

Demographics

2010
At the 2010 census Lakeport had a population of 4,753. The racial makeup of Lakeport was 3,932 (82.7%) White, 46 (1.0%) African American, 147 (3.1%) Native American, 99 (2.1%) Asian, 5 (0.1%) Pacific Islander, 337 (7.1%) from other races, and 187 (3.9%) from two or more races. Hispanic or Latino of any race were 799 people (16.8%).

The census reported that 4,616 people (97.1% of the population) lived in households, 11 (0.2%) lived in non-institutionalized group quarters, and 126 (2.7%) were institutionalized.

There were 2,002 households, 563 (28.1%) had children under the age of 18 living in them, 803 (40.1%) were opposite-sex married couples living together, 260 (13.0%) had a female householder with no husband present, 110 (5.5%) had a male householder with no wife present.  There were 177 (8.8%) unmarried opposite-sex partnerships, and 16 (0.8%) same-sex married couples or partnerships. 665 households (33.2%) were one person and 328 (16.4%) had someone living alone who was 65 or older. The average household size was 2.31.  There were 1,173 families (58.6% of households); the average family size was 2.93.

The age distribution was 1,031 people (21.7%) under the age of 18, 352 people (7.4%) aged 18 to 24, 1,033 people (21.7%) aged 25 to 44, 1,384 people (29.1%) aged 45 to 64, and 953 people (20.1%) who were 65 or older.  The median age was 44.2 years. For every 100 females, there were 90.8 males.  For every 100 females age 18 and over, there were 86.8 males.

There were 2,395 housing units at an average density of 748.8 per square mile, of the occupied units 1,198 (59.8%) were owner-occupied and 804 (40.2%) were rented. The homeowner vacancy rate was 5.1%; the rental vacancy rate was 8.4%.  2,661 people (56.0% of the population) lived in owner-occupied housing units and 1,955 people (41.1%) lived in rental housing units.

2000
At the 2000 census there were 4,820 people in 1,967 households, including 1,233 families, in the city. The racial makeup of the city was 88.7% White, 0.8% African American, 2.0% Native American, 1.5% Asian, 0.2% Pacific Islander, 3.5% from other races, and 3.4% from two or more races. Hispanic or Latino of any race were 11.5%.

Of the 1,967 households 29.7% had children under the age of 18 living with them, 44.7% were married couples living together, 12.6% had a female householder with no husband present, and 37.3% were non-families. 31.0% of households were one person and 16.2% were one person aged 65 or older.  The average household size was 2.36 and the average family size was 2.93.

The age distribution was 24.5% under the age of 18, 6.9% from 18 to 24, 24.7% from 25 to 44, 22.8% from 45 to 64, and 21.0% 65 or older.  The median age was 41 years. For every 100 females, there were 86.9 males.  For every 100 females age 18 and over, there were 84.7 males.

The median household income was $32,226 and the median family income  was $37,900. Males had a median income of $36,719 versus $25,089 for females. The per capita income for the city was $17,215.  About 13.5% of families and 15.7% of the population were below the poverty line, including 20.9% of those under age 18 and 5.6% of those age 65 or over.

Given the fact that the Lakeport area has an economy that is based somewhat on agricultural activities occurring in the Big Valley and Scotts Valley area which involve the growing and harvesting of food and nut crops as well as the increasing wine industry, there are a significant number of transient and seasonal farm workers.  The need for housing, health care services, child care, and other services is clearly evident in this segment of the population.  Insufficient data is available to quantify the total number of seasonal or transient farm laborers that are living or working in the Lakeport area.

Government

References

External links

 

 
Cities in Lake County, California
County seats in California
Incorporated cities and towns in California
Populated places established in 1888
1888 establishments in California